is a Japanese experimental metal band from Tokyo, formed in 1989. They gradually shifted from a traditional extreme metal sound to a more experimental, avant-garde style employing symphonic, world music, and progressive elements. Their most recent album, Shiki, was released in 2022.

History
Sigh was founded as a Nordic-influenced black metal band in 1989, with bassist/vocalist/keyboardist Mirai Kawashima, guitarist Satoshi Fujinami, and drummer Kazuki. The band has since experienced many lineup changes, but Kawashima and Fujinami remain in the band to the present day and each has played many different instruments.

The band's first demos were recorded in 1990. Their first EP Requiem for the Fools attracted the attention of Norwegian black metal musician and producer Euronymous, who signed Sigh to his label Deathlike Silence Records. That label released Sigh's first full-length album Scorn Defeat  in 1993, shortly after Euronymous's murder. The album has since been praised for its revolutionary combination of black metal with symphonic elements. Deathlike Silence Records then ceased to exist and Sigh signed with Cacophonous Records, which released their next three albums. Those albums increasingly incorporated elements from classical and avant-garde music. In 1995 Sigh contributed to a Venom tribute album.

After disputes with Cacophonous over promotion and album rights, the band eventually found a new home at Century Media Records. Their 2001 album with Century Media, Imaginary Sonicscape, was further praised for pioneering a new genre of surrealist black metal. Sigh later released albums under Candlelight/Baphomet Records and The End Records. Their 2007 song "Inked in Blood" from the album Hangman's Hymn was named number 31 on Loudwire's list of the Top 21st Century Metal Songs. The band is featured in the 2008 documentary Global Metal. By the end of that decade, the band's lineup solidified with the addition of drummer Junichi Harashima and saxophonist/backup singer Dr. Mikannibal (Mika Kawashima). Second guitarist You Oshima (formerly of Kadenzza) joined in 2014.

In the 2010s, Sigh's albums continued to experiment with various genre elements, and increasingly turned toward progressive metal. Their eleventh full-length album, Heir to Despair, was released in 2018 and was noted for its incorporation of instruments and compositional styles from traditional Japanese music. Band leader Mirai Kawashima learned to play flute for this album, and it also incorporates Middle Eastern and Central Asian sounds. In 2022, Sigh's twelfth full-length album, Shiki, built upon the same combination of progressive metal and Japanese instrumentation.

Members
Current
 Mirai Kawashima – lead vocals, keyboards, sampling, programming, vocoder (1989–present), woodwinds (2010–present), bass (1989–2004, 2022–present), percussion  (2004–present), orchestral arrangements (2007–present)
 Dr. Mikannibal (Mika Kawashima) – alto saxophone, vocals (2007–present)
 Nozomu Wakai (望 若井) –  guitars (2022–present),
 Satoshi Fujinami – bass (2004–2021), drums (1992–2004, 2008, с2015), guitar (1989–1992, 2008, с 2015), 

Former
 Kazuki Ozeki – drums (1989)
 Shinichi Ishikawa – guitars (1992–2014)
 You Oshima – guitars (2014–2021)
 Junichi Harashima – drums (2004–2021)

Discography
The band's major releases follow an acrostic pattern of the word "SIGH" repeated: Scorn Defeat, Infidel Art, Ghastly Funeral Theatre, Hail Horror Hail, and so on.

Studio albums
 Scorn Defeat (1993)
 Infidel Art (1995)
 Hail Horror Hail (1997)
 Scenario IV: Dread Dreams (1999)
 Imaginary Sonicscape (2001)
 Gallows Gallery (2005)
 Hangman's Hymn (2007)
 Scenes from Hell (2010)
 In Somniphobia (2012)
 Graveward (2015)
 Heir to Despair (2018)
 Shiki (2022)

EPs
 Requiem for Fools (1992)
 Ghastly Funeral Theatre (1997)
 A Tribute to Venom (2008)
 The Curse of Izanagi 7" (2010)

Demos
 Desolation (1990)
 Tragedies (1990)

References

External links
SIGH （Domestic）
SIGH Official Merch Store（Overseas）
SIGH Official Merch Store（Overseas mobile）
myspace

1989 establishments in Japan
Japanese black metal musical groups
Japanese progressive metal musical groups
Japanese avant-garde metal musical groups
Musical groups established in 1989
Musical groups from Tokyo
Musical quintets
Candlelight Records artists